Six species of deer are living wild in Great Britain: Scottish red deer, roe deer, fallow deer, sika deer, Reeves's muntjac, and Chinese water deer. Of those, Scottish red and roe deer are native and have lived in the isles throughout the Holocene. Fallow deer have been reintroduced twice, by the Romans and the Normans, after dying out in the last ice age. The other three are escaped or released alien species.

Native
Scottish red deer - (subspecies)
Roe deer

Introduced
Fallow deer
Sika deer
Reeves's muntjac
Water deer

Reintroduced
Eurasian elk - (on private reserves)
Reindeer - (on private reserves)

Extinct
Irish elk

Gallery

References 

Great Britain
Fauna of Great Britain
Deer in Scotland